Quando Eu Era Vivo (When I Was Alive) is a 2014 Brazilian horror drama thriller film directed by Marco Dutra, based on the novel A Arte de Produzir Efeito Sem Causa by Lourenço Mutarelli.

Plot
After the loss of his job and the break-up of his marriage, Junior (Marat Descartes) goes back to live with his father (Antônio Fagundes) at his former childhood home which is now completely refurbished. His bedroom is now occupied by a young and innocent tenant, Bruna (Sandy Leah). He feels a stranger at his father's place, which he finds quite inhospitable and oppressive. At first he sleeps on the couch and spends most of his days cooped up at home brooding over his separation, unemployment as well as spying on Bruna. However, his vulnerable personality takes a turn for the worse when he settles in a small back room cluttered with decorative remembrances of his late mum, which he resolutely puts back on display around the house much to his father's consternation. Among the things he recovers there is an old music score with a mysterious cryptographed message, the comprehension of which is the key to understanding his own past and present better. He gradually and irremediably becomes obsessed with his family's past, recalling amidst an intermixture of delusional disorder and grasps of reality his childhood days spent in the company of his older brother and mystical mother, while suspenseful obscure happenings concurrently become frequent in the house routine.

Cast
Antônio Fagundes as Sênior
Marat Descartes as Júnior
Sandy Leah as Bruna
Gilda Nomacce as Miranda
Kiko Bertholini as Pedro
Helena Albergaria as Olga
Rony Koren as Paulinho
Tuna Dwek as Lurdinha
Eduardo Gomes as Zuzu

References

External links
 

2014 thriller drama films
2014 films
Brazilian thriller drama films
Films based on Brazilian novels
Films shot in São Paulo
2014 drama films
2010s Portuguese-language films